City of Dreams is a casino resort in Cotai, Macau, SAR of People's Republic of China. Built, owned and managed by Melco Resorts & Entertainment, the resort, also known as CoD or CoD Macau, opened on June 1, 2009. Described as a "mega-casino" by The Guardian, in 2020 City of Dreams was the third-largest casino in the world.

History

2003-2009: Construction and opening
The resort was commissioned and developed in Macau by Melco Crown Entertainment, a joint venture of Melco Resorts & Entertainment and Crown Entertainment. With construction lasting six years, City of Dreams was one of the few gaming developments in Macau to continue construction during the global financial crisis of 2008. Total costs came to US$2.4 billion. Shortly before the 2009 grand opening, City of Dreams was the title sponsor for Matthew Marsh in the 2008 Macau Guia race. The first phase of City of Dreams, including the Hard Rock Hotel and the Crown Towers, opened on June 1, 2009. Upon opening, the resort included a 420,000-square-foot casino, 500 gambling tables, a mall, and restaurants. It was the first casino to open in Macau in almost two years after the Venetian Macao, and was Macau's second-largest casino complex. Opening attractions included an 8 meter bubble fountain and dome theater featuring multimedia productions based on Chinese mythology. The grand opening was followed by the opening of the two Grand Hyatt hotel towers in October 2009, with 424 rooms in the Grand Tower and 367 in the "premium" Grand Club Tower. The hotel's ballroom could fit up to 2,500 guests, while primary restaurants included mezza9 Macau and Beijing Kitchen.

2010-2018: Changing features and expansion
Created by Franco Dragone, The House of Dancing Water show incorporates various design elements such as fire, water effects, and atmospheric effects, and opened in the Dancing Water Theatre at the resort on September 17, 2010. Two years later, "the show was the recipient of a Thea Award for Outstanding Achievement for a Live Show Spectacular. The largest branded poker room in Macau, hosted by PokerStars, opened at City of Dreams in February 2013. A resident cabaret show by Dragone, Taboo, also debuted at the resort's Club Cubic venue in 2013, before closing in 2016. According to Barron's, in 2015 City of Dreams contributed 80% of Melco Resorts' revenue.

After a two year construction process, The Boulevard, which includes  of retail space surrounding the resort on two levels,  was expanded in 2016. The project, developed with DFS, expanded on the original 70 shops and added outlets along Estrada do Istmo, Cotai's main street. In 2017 the Hard Rock Hotel was rebranded The Countdown Hotel, although the Hard Rock Café Macau retained its original branding. In May 2018, Crown Resorts ceased to be a co-owner of City of Dreams, and Crown Towers was rebranded to Nüwa. The resort's fifth tower, Morpheus, opened in 2018 with design by Zaha Hadid Architects and cuisine by Alain Ducasse.

2019-2022: Revamp and hotel rebrandings 
Melco Resorts & Entertainment Limited announced in 2019 that City of Dreams' hotels would undergo a revamp. The project includes a renovation of the Nüwa, three new luxury villas at the Morpheus, and a rebranding of The Countdown Hotel. By April 2019, The House of Dancing Water was the oldest running show on the Cotai Strip and had been seen by around 5 million spectators. In 2019, The House of Dancing Water production was purchased entirely by Melco Resorts from Dragone Macau Limitada, with Dragone retained as artistic director. After closing for a year for renovations, the Nüwa hotel reopened on March 31, 2021 with 300 hotel units, 33 of which were luxury villas. In August 2021, Inside Asian Gaming reported that the resort had seen its quarterly operating revenue increase from US$120.8 million in 2020 to $363.8 million in 2021. This comprised over half of Melco Resort's $530.8 million revenue for the quarter overall. In early October 2021, a government mandate temporarily closed all of Macau's entertainment venues, including City of Dreams's Club Cubic venue. Melco Resorts announced on October 8, 2021 Club Cubic would be rebranded and that it would take over operations and management from the current operators. The club's new name was afterwards announced as Para Club.

Design and features

Described as a "mega-casino" by The Guardian, in March 2020, City of Dreams was the third-largest casino in the world. Also known as CoD or CoD Macau, in total the integrated resort has three separate casinos, four hotels, five hotel towers, about 2,270 total rooms, over 30 restaurants and bars,  of retail space,  of gaming space, 496 gaming tables, and 487 gaming machines.

Hotels

Retail, spas, dining

Among major shopping areas at the resort are the Morpheus Boutique, as well as the T Galleria by DFS. Among stores in the retail areas of City of Dreams are fashion brands such as Alexander McQueen, Burberry, Canada Goose, and Hermès.

There are also a number of spas, pools and fitness clubs at the resort, as well as around 40 food and beverage venues. The SOHO area serves as a food court with around a dozen restaurants and bars. Examples of restaurants include the Jade Dragon at Nüwa Luxury Hotel. At Morpheus, Yi serves Chinese cuisine while L'ATTITUDE serves French cuisine. Other restaurants include Beijing Kitchen and mezza9 Macau at the Grand Hyatt Macau.

Entertainment

There is an art gallery at Morpheus, a theater, various art features, and a large play area for children. By 2016, the pool next to the Hard Rock Hotel was hosting large poolside parties with entertainers such as Redfoo of LMFAO.

There is sloped seating for as many as 2,000 theatre patrons to view acrobatics and water displays. With design by Pei Partnership Architects and Thinkwell Group, its longstanding show is Franco Dragone Entertainment's The House of Dancing Water. In November 2020, Melco confirmed the show was closed due to the coronavirus pandemic. The show remained on hiatus as of 2022, with a new performance being developed.
Kids' City - Kids’ City was Macau’s largest children's attraction when it opened in 2010. The attraction provides child supervision, party planners, and music events and performances. Closed in early 2020 during the coronavirus pandemic, by 2022 the attraction had reopened for ages 2 to 12.
Para Club - The locale operates Para Club, a large nightclub with a stage, a dance pool, VIP rooms, and bars. It was previously named Club Cubic.

Transportation

Bus 
There are several shuttle bus services connecting the City of Dreams to Macau's major ports of entry and nearby resorts. These shuttle services are provided free of charge. However, due to the COVID-19 pandemic, some services were temporarily not in operation as of 2021.

 City of Dreams to Border Gate
 City of Dreams to Hengqin Port
 City of Dreams to Studio City
 City of Dreams to Altira

Macau Light Rapid Transit 

City of Dreams is within walking distance from Cotai East Station on the Taipa section of the Macau Light Rapid Transit that serves parts of Cotai.

Gallery

See also
 Altira Macau
 Macao Studio City
 Gambling in Macau 
 List of Macau casinos

References

External links

 

Casinos completed in 2009
Hotel buildings completed in 2009
Casino hotels
Resorts in Macau
Casinos in Macau
2009 establishments in Macau
Cotai
Arquitectonica buildings